The Laurence Frost Amphitheater, commonly known as Frost Amphitheater, is a prominent amphitheater at Stanford University. It first opened in 1937 and was the site of commencement ceremonies for the university from 1938 until 1984. It can hold about 8,000 people.

History
The amphitheater built in 1937 was a gift of Mr. and Mrs. Howard Frost in memory of their son, John Laurence Frost, who graduated in 1935 and died of polio in the same year. It is a tree lined, grassy, tiered  bowl designed by landscape architect Leslie Kiler.

Throughout the years, the amphitheater has been the host to many events including a prominent speech by Soviet President Mikhail Gorbachev in 1992.

Music venue
The Grateful Dead played 14 shows at the Amphitheater in 1982, 1983, 1985, 1986, 1987, 1988, and 1989. Since 2012, the Stanford Concert Network, a student organization, has hosted the annual Frost Music and Arts Festival at the Amphitheater each May, which has featured headliners Modest Mouse, MGMT, Dispatch, Flume, and Fetty Wap, as well as Eyes Lips Eyes, Benjamin Francis Leftwich, Delorean, Kuroma, Paper Void, Yeasayer, Kaytranada, AlunaGeorge, and Sage the Gemini.

The amphitheater usually hosts a concert (either jazz or classical) and fireworks on July 3.

References

Further reading
 

Stanford University buildings and structures
Amphitheaters in California
Music venues in the San Francisco Bay Area
Music venues completed in 1937
1937 establishments in California